Buchnera is a genus of flowering plants belonging to the family Orobanchaceae. Its native range is Northern and Tropical America, Tropical and Southern Africa, Madagascar, Arabian Peninsula Tropical Asia, Australia.

Species:

Buchnera affinis 
Buchnera albiflora 
Buchnera americana 
Buchnera amethystina 
Buchnera andongensis 
Buchnera androsacea 
Buchnera angustissima 
Buchnera arenicola 
Buchnera asperata 
Buchnera attenuata 
Buchnera bampsiana 
Buchnera bangweolensis 
Buchnera baumii 
Buchnera benthamiana 
Buchnera bequaertii 
Buchnera bowalensis 
Buchnera bragaana 
Buchnera buchneroides 
Buchnera bukamensis 
Buchnera cambodiana 
Buchnera candida 
Buchnera capitata 
Buchnera carajasensis 
Buchnera chimanimaniensis 
Buchnera chisumpae 
Buchnera ciliata 
Buchnera ciliolata 
Buchnera congoensis 
Buchnera convallicola 
Buchnera cruciata 
Buchnera cryptocephala 
Buchnera decandollei 
Buchnera descampsii 
Buchnera dilungensis 
Buchnera disticha 
Buchnera dundensis 
Buchnera dura 
Buchnera ebracteolata 
Buchnera ensifolia 
Buchnera erinoides 
Buchnera exserta 
Buchnera filicaulis 
Buchnera flexuosa 
Buchnera floridana 
Buchnera foliosa 
Buchnera garuensis 
Buchnera geminiflora 
Buchnera gossweileri 
Buchnera gracilis 
Buchnera granitica 
Buchnera henriquesii 
Buchnera hispida 
Buchnera hockii 
Buchnera humilis 
Buchnera humpatensis 
Buchnera inflata 
Buchnera jacoborum 
Buchnera juncea 
Buchnera kassneri 
Buchnera keilii 
Buchnera kingaensis 
Buchnera lastii 
Buchnera lavandulacea 
Buchnera laxiflora 
Buchnera ledermannii 
Buchnera leptostachya 
Buchnera libenii 
Buchnera linearis 
Buchnera lippioides 
Buchnera lisowskiana 
Buchnera longespicata 
Buchnera longifolia 
Buchnera lundensis 
Buchnera metallorum 
Buchnera minutiflora 
Buchnera multicaulis 
Buchnera namuliensis 
Buchnera nervosa 
Buchnera nigricans 
Buchnera nitida 
Buchnera nuttii 
Buchnera nyassica 
Buchnera obliqua 
Buchnera orgyalis 
Buchnera pallescens 
Buchnera palustris 
Buchnera paucidentata 
Buchnera peduncularis 
Buchnera philcoxii 
Buchnera poggei 
Buchnera prorepens 
Buchnera pulcherrima 
Buchnera pusilla 
Buchnera pusilliflora 
Buchnera quadrifaria 
Buchnera quangensis 
Buchnera ramosissima 
Buchnera randii 
Buchnera rariflora 
Buchnera reducta 
Buchnera reissiana 
Buchnera remotiflora 
Buchnera retrorsa 
Buchnera robynsii 
Buchnera rosea 
Buchnera rubriflora 
Buchnera rungwensis 
Buchnera ruwenzoriensis 
Buchnera saigonensis 
Buchnera scabridula 
Buchnera schliebenii 
Buchnera schultesii 
Buchnera simplex 
Buchnera speciosa 
Buchnera splendens 
Buchnera spruceana 
Buchnera stachytarphetoides 
Buchnera strictissima 
Buchnera subcapitata 
Buchnera subglabra 
Buchnera symoensiana 
Buchnera tacianae 
Buchnera tenella 
Buchnera tenuifolia 
Buchnera tenuissima 
Buchnera ternifolia 
Buchnera tetragona 
Buchnera tetrasticha 
Buchnera timorensis 
Buchnera tomentosa 
Buchnera trilobata 
Buchnera urticifolia 
Buchnera usuiensis 
Buchnera vandenberghenii 
Buchnera verbenoides 
Buchnera verdickii 
Buchnera virgata 
Buchnera weberbaueri 
Buchnera welwitschii 
Buchnera wildii

References

Orobanchaceae
Orobanchaceae genera